Iván González (born December 12, 1964) is a Spanish sprint canoer who competed in the mid-1980s. He finished sixth in the K-4 1000 m event at the 1984 Summer Olympics in Los Angeles.

References
Sports-Reference.com profile

1964 births
Canoeists at the 1984 Summer Olympics
Living people
Olympic canoeists of Spain
Spanish male canoeists
Place of birth missing (living people)
20th-century Spanish people